The Battle of Grapevine Creek was a short battle between two large armed groups of the Hatfield family and the McCoy family which was the last offensive event during the Hatfield–McCoy feud and marked the beginning of the end in the feud between the two families.

Battle
Shortly after the capture and killing of Jim Vance in January 1888, the Hatfield family, led by Devil Anse Hatfield, prepared for one last major offensive against the McCoy family in order to gain revenge for the killing of Jim Vance and to achieve victory over the McCoy family to end the feud. When news of the Hatfields' preparations for war reached the McCoy side, the Hatfields were already en route to invade the McCoy territory, so Frank Phillips, the leader of the McCoy posse, rounded up every able man he could and led his posse to intercept the invading Hatfields. Two McCoys were members of Philipps' posse, Bud McCoy and one of Randolph's own sons James "Jim" McCoy. 

Both sides eventually met around the area of the Grapevine Creek on the West Virginia side of the Tug Fork River and began exchanging shots at each other. One group of the McCoy side managed to lure the Hatfields into one area of the battlefield while another group of McCoys moved to outflank them, which caused the Hatfields to suffer multiple casualties and made them retreat. A number of Hatfields did not manage to escape and were taken prisoner by the McCoys.

Aftermath
As a result of the battle some members of the Hatfield side were taken prisoner. These prisoners alongside those from prior to the battle were put on trial with the permission of the Kentucky government for the various crimes they had committed during the feud, mainly the murder of the Randall McCoy's sons for killing Ellison Hatfield and the killing of one of his daughters during the New Year's Eve massacre. All the Hatfields were found guilty and sent to prison except for Cottontop Ellison Mounts, the illegitimate son of Ellison Hatfield, who was sentenced to death as it was he who was proved to have killed Randall McCoy's daughter.

See also
 Hatfield–McCoy feud

References

History of Kentucky
History of West Virginia
History of the Southern United States
Culture of the Southern United States
American folklore
Society of Appalachia
 
Feuds in the United States
Folklore of the Southern United States